Sigtunaskolan Humanistiska Läroverket (SSHL) is a coeducational independent school for boarding and day pupils between the seventh and twelfth grades. It is located in Sigtuna, Sweden. The school is attended by Swedish boarders, local children and foreigners.

As a non-profit private boarding school, management of the SSHL's financial and physical resources is jointly overseen by the Sigtuna Skolstiftelse (Sigtuna School Foundation), the Sigtunastiftelsen (National Sigtuna Foundation) and the Knut and Alice Wallenberg Foundation; all the trustees are drawn from  Sigtuna citizens and school alumni. Day-to-day operations are headed by a school director and a principal, who is appointed by the trustees.

SSHL alumni include the current King of Sweden, Carl XVI Gustaf, and Olof Palme, the former Prime Minister of Sweden. SSHL is a member of the global G20 Schools group.

History

Dating back to the mid-1920s, there were two boarding schools in Sigtuna: Sigtunastiftelsens Humanistiska Läroverk, which was founded by Bishop Manfred Björkquist, and Sigtunaskolan, the other boarding school that was founded by theologian Harry Cullberg.

The two schools merged in 1980 to form Sigtunaskolan Humanistiska Läroverket on where Sigtunastiftelsens Humanistiska Läroverk used to stand, a hill on the western side of Sigtuna.

During the night between 28 February and 1 March 2021, the school's almost 100 year old assembly hall, called Aula (originally the sports hall), caught on fire and was completely burmt down.

Education

Classes at SSHL are held Monday through Friday. Boarding students are often offered lectures and educational interventions on specific Sundays, known at the school as "Academic Sunday". Emphasizing the school's primary principle of offering a Swedish educational experience with international characteristics, the school offers programs in Swedish and English.

International Baccalaureate Diploma Programme 

SSHL offers students from 7th to 10th grade to attend the IB Middle Years Programme (MYP) and final year students to undertake the two-year Diploma program. The school offer a variety of subjects to cater to the diverse body of students taking the program at SSHL and offer support CAS (Creativity, activity, service), a central emphasis of the IB program by organizing service trips to Laos, Nepal and Kenya. Students at SSHL studying the IB achieve a point average of 31.

Notable alumni

Carl XVI Gustaf (1946-), Swedish king
Olof Palme (1927-1986), former Swedish prime minister
Curt Nicolin (1921-2006), Swedish industrialist, former CEO and President of ASEA and ABB
Annika Falkengren (1962-), Swedish industrialist, former President and CEO of Skandinaviska Enskilda Banken
Richard, 6th Prince of Sayn-Wittgenstein-Berleburg (1934-2017)
Carl Adam Lewenhaupt (1947–2017), Swedish count and businessman
Ella Rappich (2000-), Swedish actress

Sports 
SSHL is member of the Northwest European Council of international Schools (NECIS), an organization founded in 1980, as well as of Sweden's Boarding and Private Schools' Sports Organization (Svenska Internat och Privatskolors Idrottsorganisation, SIPSI), founded in 1983, which allow students from different European and Swedish schools to compete in various sporting events throughout the academic year.

Furthermore, SSHL students compete against each other in the so called "House Series". Pupils are able to represent one of the school's "Houses" to which they belong, and take part in different athletic tournaments.

See also
List of boarding schools
G30 Schools

References

External links
Sigtunaskolan Humanistiska Läroverket
Sigtuna Fördettingar

Boarding schools in Sweden
International Baccalaureate schools in Sweden
Sigtuna Municipality